Enga Kattula Mazhai is a 2018 Indian Tamil-language romantic comedy film directed by  Sri Balaji and starring Mithun Maheswaran and Shruthi Ramakrishnan.

Cast 
Mithun Maheswaran as Murugan
Shruthi Ramakrishnan as Mageshwari
Aadhavan as a golden retriever (voice)
Aruldoss as Agni Eshwaran
Appukutty as Kuberan
 Chaams
 Jangiri Madhumitha as a nurse

Production 
The film is directed by Sri Balaji of Kullanari Koottam fame. Appukutty, who starred in  Kullanari Koottam is also a part of this film. The film features a golden retriever in a prominent role and was produced by Rama Narayanan. The release of the film was delayed by Narayanan's previous venture Mersal (2017).

Soundtrack
Soundtrack was composed by Srivijay.
"Adada Kadhal" - Karthik
"Ava Oru Loosu" - Gana Bala
"Oor Mutham" - Haricharan, Suganya
"Enga Katula Mazhai" - Suchith Suresan, Peer Mohammed
"Kokku Pitchva" - Ranjith

Release 
The film released along with eight other Tamil films on 3 August 2018.

The Times of India gave the film a rating of one out of five stars and wrote that "Even for a generic comedy thriller, Enga Kaattula Mazhai is filled with clichés that turn it highly predictable". Cinema Express also gave the film the same rating and stated that "A poorly written spin-off of Thedinen Vanthathu, that hardly evokes a giggle".

References

External links 

Indian romantic comedy films
2010s Tamil-language films
2018 romantic comedy films